The Government Cable Office in Seward, Alaska, United States, is a historic building that served as a telegraph office that connected Seward with communications in the rest of the United States.

The cable office was constructed in 1905 by the U.S. Army Signal Corps as part of the Washington–Alaska Military Cable and Telegraph System (WAMCATS). Telegraph service from the lower states first connected to Valdez, Alaska. In summer 1905, submarine cable was extended from Valdez to Seward.

The first message over the line was to A. C. Frost, president of the Alaska Central Railway, who was in Chicago: "This first message transmitted over Alaska Cable connects Seward from this day to the great city of Chicago." Among initial regular users of the telegraph line was the local newspaper, the Seward Daily Gateway. In August 1905, owner Frank Ballaine began featuring the previous day's news from the Coterminous United States in his paper. Before the telegraph line, outside news arrived via steam ship days or weeks later.

The office was operated by Army personnel. The front room of the building was open to the public who could send and receive messages. The central part of the ground floor served as the operator's station, while workers lived on the second floor. Service continued until an earthquake severed the line in 1934. By that time, radio communication had been established by the Navy and the telegraph line was not replaced. The government retained ownership until 1961. Since then, the building has served as a private residence and rented apartments.

The building was listed on the National Register of Historic Places in 1980.

See also
National Register of Historic Places listings in Kenai Peninsula Borough, Alaska

References

1905 establishments in Alaska
Communications in Alaska
Government buildings completed in 1905
Government buildings on the National Register of Historic Places in Alaska
Buildings and structures on the National Register of Historic Places in Kenai Peninsula Borough, Alaska
Office buildings in Alaska
Pre-statehood history of Alaska
Buildings and structures in Seward, Alaska
Telecommunications buildings on the National Register of Historic Places